Alan James is a South African writer, now living in Australia. A former law lecturer, and the founder of the poetry journal Upstream, he has published seven collections of poetry. In 1995, James received the Olive Schreiner Prize for Morning near Genandendal. m He has more recently published two volumes of day-to-day bible readings.

Works
The Dictator (1972)
From Bitterfontein (1974)
At a Rail Halt (1981)
Producing the Landscape (1987)
Morning Near Genadendal (1992)
Ferry to Robben Island (1996)
The First Bushman's Path: Stories, Songs and Testimonies of the /Xam of the northern Cape: versions with commentary (2001)
"They will call him Immanuel" (2017)
"The Messiah must suffer and rise" (2017)

External links 
James maintains a website at https://gospelreadings.wixsite.com/alanjames.

References
Klemperer, Margaret (2002). "Preserving a lost culture". The Natal Witness, 7 March 2002, p. 11.
 English Academy of South Africa Newsletter 16, 1996, pg 3.

Living people
South African male poets
20th-century South African male writers
21st-century South African male writers
Christian writers
20th-century South African poets
21st-century South African poets
Year of birth missing (living people)